Managed services is the practice of outsourcing the responsibility for maintaining, and anticipating need for, a range of processes and functions, ostensibly for the purpose of improved operations and reduced budgetary expenditures through the reduction of directly-employed staff. It is an alternative to the break/fix or on-demand outsourcing model where the service provider performs on-demand services and bills the customer only for the work done.

Advantages and challenges
Adopting managed services is intended to be an efficient way to stay up-to-date on technology, have access to  skills and address issues related to cost, quality of service and risk. As the IT infrastructure components of many SMB and large corporations are migrating to the cloud, with  MSPs (managed services providers)  increasingly facing the challenge of cloud computing, a number of MSPs are providing in-house cloud services or acting as brokers with cloud services providers.  A recent survey claims that a lack of knowledge and expertise in cloud computing rather than offerors' reluctance, appears to be the main obstacle to this transition. For example, in transportation, many companies face a significant increase of fuel and carrier costs, driver shortages, customer service requests and global supply chain complexities. Managing day-to-day transportation processes and reducing related costs come as significant burdens that require the expertise of Transportation Managed Services (or managed transportation services) providers.

History and evolution
The evolution of MSP started in the 1990s with the emergence of application service providers (ASPs) who helped pave the way for remote support for IT infrastructure. From the initial focus of remote monitoring and management of servers and networks, the scope of an MSP's services expanded to include mobile device management, managed security, remote firewall administration and security-as-a-service, and managed print services. Around 2005, Karl W. Palachuk, Amy Luby, Founder of Managed Service Provider Services Network acquired by High Street Technology Ventures, and Erick Simpson, founder of Managed Services Provider University, were the first advocates and the pioneers of the managed services business model.

The first books on the topic of managed services: Service Agreements for SMB Consultants: A Quick-Start Guide to Managed Services and The Guide to a Successful Managed Services Practice were published in 2006 by Palachuk and Simpson, respectively. Since then, the managed services business model has gained ground among enterprise-level companies. As the value-added reseller (VAR) community evolved to a higher level of services, it adapted the managed service model and tailored it to SMB companies.

In the new economy, IT manufacturers are currently moving away from a "box-shifting" resale to a more customized, managed service offering. In this transition, the billing and sales processes of intangible managed services, appear as the main challenges for traditional resellers.

The global managed services market is expected to grow from an estimated $342.9 Billion in 2020 to $410.2 Billion by 2027, representing a CAGR of 2.6%.

Types
In the information technology area, the most common managed services appear to evolve around connectivity and bandwidth, network monitoring, security, virtualization, and disaster recovery. Beyond traditional application and infrastructure management, managed services may also include storage, desktop and communications, mobility, help desk, and technical support.  In general, common managed services include the following applications.

Provision

Definition
A Managed IT Services Provider (also known as an 'MSP') is a third-party service provider that proactively monitors & manages a customer's server / network infrastructure, cybersecurity and end-user systems against a clearly defined Service Level Agreement (SLA). Small and medium-sized businesses (SMBs), nonprofits and government agencies hire MSPs to perform a defined set of day-to-day management services so they can focus on improving their services without worrying about extended system downtimes or service interruptions. These services may include network and infrastructure management, security and monitoring.. Most MSPs bill an upfront setup or transition fee and an ongoing flat or near-fixed monthly fee, which benefits clients by providing them with predictable IT support costs. Sometimes, MSPs act as facilitators who manage and procure staffing services on behalf of the client. In such context, they use an online application called vendor management system (VMS) for transparency and efficiency. A managed service provider is also useful in creating disaster recovery plans, similar to a corporation's.

The managed services model has been useful in the private sector, notably among Fortune 500 companies, and has an interesting future in government.

Main players
Main managed service providers originate from the United States (IBM, Accenture, Cognizant), Europe (Atos, Capgemini) and India (TCS, Infosys, Wipro).

See also
 Application service provider
 Customer service
 Enterprise architecture
 Information technology outsourcing
 Managed service company
 Remote monitoring and management
 Service (economics)
 Service provider
 Service science, management and engineering
 Service level agreement
 Technical support
 Web service

References

Further reading
 
 Managed Services in a Month, 2nd edition. Great Little Book Publishing Co., Inc. 2013.
 The Guide to a Successful Managed Services Practice,  January 2013. Intelligent Enterprise.
 

Business-to-business
Business occupations
Business terms
International trade
Outsourcing
Service industries
Supply chain management